Anas Abu Rahma (Arabic: أنس أبو رحمة)  is a children's author born in 1985 in the city of Ramallah, Palestine. He has published a poetry collection under the title Diwan Hijab and has also published books for children like The Yellow Corn Inn (original title: Nazl al-Thura al-Safra’) and (We are) Going to (original title: Thahiboun ila), as well as other books, Sheep and Wool (original title: Kharouf wa Soof), (We are) Very Hungry (original title: Ja’oun Jidan) and others. He has also written several articles for websites on the Internet.

Career 
Anas’s career started in Palestinian lands in places like Jordan valley and Bedouin communities, in order to encourage the habit of reading and to help children develop their ability to express and to improve their communication skills. He has also worked with teachers and mothers and helped schools apply children’s literature. Anas Abu Rahma had also written several episodes for children’s television programs.

Awards 
Anas’s novel, The Yellow Corn Inn was nominated for the Etisalat Award for children’s literature 2015. The Yellow Corn Inn also won Arab Publishers Award for being the best work for young adults in 2016.  In 30 October 2019 during the Sharjah international Book Fair, the Palestinian writer won the 11th Etisalat Award for his illustrated story, A Story About S and L which was issued by the National House for Publishing and distribution in the Jordanian capital, Amman.

Works 
His most prominent works are:

 “Diwan Hijab” 
 “The Yellow Corn Inn” (original title: Nazl al-Thura al-Safra’)
 “(We are) Going to” (original title: Thahiboun Ila)
 “Red” (original title: Ahmar)
 “Sheep and Wool” (original title: Kharouf wa Soof)
 “Marw Lane” (original title: Harat Marw)
 “(We are) Very Hungry” (original title: Ja’oun Jidan)

References 

Palestinian short story writers
Palestinian novelists
Palestinian refugees
1985 births
Living people
21st-century Palestinian writers
21st-century male writers
21st-century novelists
Male novelists
21st-century short story writers
People from Ramallah
Palestinian children's writers
21st-century Palestinian poets
Palestinian male poets